Tyrosine aminotransferase (or tyrosine transaminase) is an enzyme present in the liver and catalyzes the conversion of tyrosine to 4-hydroxyphenylpyruvate.

L-tyrosine + 2-oxoglutarate  4-hydroxyphenylpyruvate + L-glutamate

In humans, the tyrosine aminotransferase protein is encoded by the TAT gene.  A deficiency of the enzyme in humans can result in what is known as type II tyrosinemia, wherein there is an abundance of tyrosine as a result of tyrosine failing to undergo an aminotransferase reaction to form 4-hydroxyphenylpyruvate.

Mechanism 

Structures of the three main molecules involved in chemical reaction catalyzed by the tyrosine aminotransferase enzyme are shown below: the amino acid tyrosine (left), the prosthetic group pyridoxal phosphate (right), and the resulting product 4-hydroxyphenylpyruvate (center).

Each side of the dimer protein includes pyridoxal phosphate (PLP) bonded to the Lys280 residue of the tyrosine aminotransferase molecule.  The amine group of tyrosine attacks the alpha carbon of the imine bonded to Lys280, forming a tetrahedral complex and then kicking off the LYS-ENZ.  This process is known as transimination by the act of switching out the imine group bonded to PLP.  The newly formed PLP-TYR molecule is then attacked by a base.

A possible candidate for the base in the mechanism could be Lys280 that was just pushed off of PLP, which sequesters the newly formed amino group of the PLP-TYR molecule.  In a similar mechanism of aspartate transaminase, the lysine that forms the initial imine to PLP later acts as the base that attacks the tyrosine in transimination.  The electrons left behind from the loss of the proton move down to form a new double bond to the imine, which in turn pushes the already double bonded electrons through PLP and end up as a lone pair on the positively charged nitrogen in the six-membered ring of the molecule.  Water attacks the alpha carbon of the imine of PLP-TYR and through acyl substitution kicks off the nitrogen of PLP and forming pyridoxamine phosphate (PMP) and 4-hydroxyphenylpyruvate.

PMP is then regenerated into PLP by transferring its amine group to alpha-ketoglutarate, reforming its aldehyde functional group. This is followed by another substitution reaction with the Lys280 residue to reform its imine linkage to the enzyme, forming ENZ-PLP.

Active site

Tyrosine Aminotransferase as a dimer has two identical active site.  Lys280 is attached to PLP, which is held in place via two nonpolar amino acid side chains; phenylalanine and isoleucine (see thumbnail on right).  The PLP is also held in place by  hydrogen bonding to surrounding molecules mainly by its phosphate group.

Shown below is one active site at three different magnifications:

Pathology

Tyrosinemia is the most common metabolic disease associated with tyrosine aminotransferase.  The disease results from a deficiency in hepatic tyrosine aminotransferase. Tyrosinemia type II (Richner-Hanhart syndrome, RHS) is a disease of autosomal recessive inheritance characterized by keratitis, palmoplantar hyperkeratosis, mental retardation, and elevated blood tyrosine levels.  Keratitis in Tyrosinemia type II patients is caused by the deposition of tyrosine crystals in the cornea and results in corneal inflammation.  The TAT gene is located on human chromosome 16q22-24 and extends over 10.9 kilobases (kb) containing 12 exons, and its 3.0 kb mRNA codes for a 454-amino acid protein of 50.4 kDa.  Twelve different TAT gene mutations have been reported.

References

Molecular graphics images were produced using the UCSF Chimera package from the Resource for Biocomputing, Visualization, and Informatics at the University of California, San Francisco (supported by NIH P41 RR-01081).

External links
 
 PDBe-KB provides an overview of all the structure information available in the PDB for Human Tyrosine aminotransferase

EC 2.6.1